Howard James Hilton (January 3, 1964 – July 12, 2011) was a Major League Baseball pitcher who appeared in two games with the St. Louis Cardinals at the start of the  season.

He played college baseball for Oxnard College before transferring to the University of Arkansas, and helping pitch the Arkansas Razorbacks, to the 1985 College World Series. Hilton was the starting pitcher in the fourth game in which his team was eliminated in extra innings.

The Cardinals drafted him in the 22nd round of the 1985 Major League Baseball Draft. After five seasons in the Cardinals' farm system, in which he went 33–30 with a 2.97 earned run average, Hilton made the team out of Spring training in 1990. During that Spring, he was involved in trade rumors that would have sent him to the Boston Red Sox for closer Lee Smith, but nothing ever materialized (a deal for Smith was eventually reached after the start of the season for Tom Brunansky).

He made his major league debut in the Cards' season opener, pitching 1.1 innings without giving up an earned run against the Montreal Expos. He entered the final game of the three game series with the Expos with one out in the eighth, and finished the game. It turned out to be his final major league appearance before he was optioned back to the triple A Louisville Redbirds.

He remained with them through .

Hilton died on July 12, 2011 at Ventura County Medical Center in Ventura, California. His death was due to complications from hip surgery.

References

External links
, or Baseball Almanac, or Sports Illustrated

1964 births
2011 deaths
Major League Baseball pitchers
St. Louis Cardinals players
Arkansas Travelers players
Erie Cardinals players
Louisville Redbirds players
St. Petersburg Cardinals players
Springfield Cardinals players
High Desert Mavericks players
Wichita Wranglers players
Baseball players from California
Oxnard Condors baseball players
Sportspeople from Oxnard, California
Sportspeople from Ventura County, California
Diablos Rojos del México players
American expatriate baseball players in Mexico
Deaths from surgical complications